Kwon So-hyun (born August 30, 1994), also known mononymously as Sohyun, is a South Korean singer and actress. She was known as a member of the South Korean girl group 4Minute, under Cube Entertainment. She is also a former member of the South Korean girl group, Orange. Before June 15, 2016 (end of her contract with Cube), Kwon left 4Minute and the record label along with members Nam Ji-hyun, Heo Ga-yoon, and Jeon Ji-yoon.

Early life 
Kwon was born in Incheon, South Korea, on August 30, 1994. She attended Kumho Junior High School and Pungmoon Girls' High School, graduating from the latter in February 2013. She was ranked fourth in her class.
In November 2014 was revealed that Kwon was accepted into Dongguk University's Department of Theatre and Film.

Kwon debuted as a member of the group Orange in 2005 when she was 12 years old. The band released their debut album, titled We Are Orange with the title track "Our Star".
The group disbanded in late 2005 due to cyber bullying and anti-fan internet cafes against the group.

In middle school, Kwon began registering for audition academies. There, she met a representative of an agency and became a trainee in less than two months. Kwon was grouped together with the other 4Minute trainees, filling the vacancy caused by Soyou's departure.

Career

4Minute and solo activities
In June 2009, Kwon made her debut as the youngest member of the girl group 4Minute under Cube Entertainment, with their single "Hot Issue".

Aside from being a member of 4Minute, Kwon has had small cameo roles on television and also participated in several variety shows. Kwon starred in Teen Top's music video, "Going Crazy" where she played the role of L.Joe's love interest. She was also one of the celebrity guests together with 2AM's Jinwoon for the documentary A Pink News which aired on the Korean cable channel TrendE.

Kwon, along with 11 other female idols, took part in the 2013 KBS Lunar New Year variety show, "Princess Project - Resurrection of the Royal Family", a spin-off based on the 2012 MBC hit drama The Moon That Embraces the Sun.

Kwon was selected as a "Special MC" for Weekly Idol's Second Idol Awards. She later reprised her role in the episodes featuring 2YOON and Huh Gak, alongside BtoB's Ilhoon.

Kwon, along with teammates Heo Ga-yoon and Nam Ji-hyun, took part in the archery segment of the 2013 Idol Star Athletics-Archery Championships. The team later competed in another archery competition against Sistar on Dream Team in June.

On June 5, 2013, Kwon and Heo took part in the ceremonial first pitch for the LG Twins against the Doosan Bears. Heo threw the first ball whilst Kwon was on the plate to bat.

On October 22, it was announced that Kwon will play the lead in the movie Hwanggu, in which she plays a spirited young college student who supports her boyfriend as struggles to win the national taekwondo title and also the prejudices of a multi-ethnical family he experiences, having a Korean mother and Filipino father.

On 13 January 2014, Kwon took part in an archery competition in 2014 Idol Star Athletics Championship. She went to the final round and won gold medal against Sistar's Bora.

On December 17, 2014, was revealed that Kwon will be in a special project girl group of composers Hyung Don and Defconn's new project group for Hitmaker, together with G.NA, After School's Lizzy and Kara's Youngji. The MV teaser for Hitmaker's first project girl group Chamsonyeo, was released on February 12, 2015. The song is called "Magic Words" and was officially released on February 20.

Post-disbandment and acting career
After the disbandment of 4Minute, Kwon left Cube Entertainment and joined 935 Entertainment. She switched to TheCNT three years later. She made a cameo appearance as a victim in Criminal Minds and landed more substantial roles in the romantic comedy The Secret Life of My Secretary and the thriller Class of Lies.

Discography

Extended plays

Featured songs

List of songs written Sohyun

Filmography

Film

Television series

References

External links

1994 births
Living people
4Minute members
Actresses from Seoul
Dongguk University alumni
Japanese-language singers of South Korea
Cube Entertainment artists
South Korean female idols
South Korean women pop singers
Singers from Seoul
South Korean child actresses
South Korean television actresses
South Korean television personalities
21st-century South Korean singers
21st-century South Korean women singers
South Korean child singers